Petropavlovsk is a rural locality (a selo) and the administrative center of Petropavlovskoye Rural Settlement, Bolshesosnovsky District, Perm Krai, Russia. The population was 588 as of 2010. There are 8 streets.

Geography 
Petropavlovsk is located 20 km west of Bolshaya Sosnova (the district's administrative centre) by road. Bolshiye Kizeli is the nearest rural locality.

References 

Rural localities in Bolshesosnovsky District